The Maronite Catholic Archeparchy of Antelias (informally Antelias of the Maronites) (in Latin: Archieparchia Anteliensis Maronitarum) is a Maronite (Antiochian Rite, Arabic), non-Metropolitan Archeparchy (Eastern Catholic Archdiocese) in northern Lebanon.

Territory and statistics 
It is immediately dependent on the Maronite Patriarch of Antioch. Its cathedral episcopal see is the Resurrection Cathedral, 5 km north of Beirut, in the Matn District, Lebanon, that is its jurisdiction.

The territory is divided into 93 parishes and in 2012 there were 249,971 Lebanese Maronite Catholic members.

History 
It was established on 11 June 1988 by Pope John Paul II on territory previously without proper Ordinary of the particular church sui iuris.

Eparchs

 Joseph Mohsen Béchara (11 June 1988 – retired 16 June 2012), previously Archeparch (Archbishop) of Cyprus of the Maronites (Cyprus) (1986.04.04 – 1988.06.11)
 Camille Zaidan (16 June 2012 – 21 October 2019), previously Titular Bishop of Ptolemais in Phœnicia of the Maronites (2011.08.13 – 2012.06.16), Bishop of Curia of the Maronites (2011.08.13 – 2012.06.16)
 Antoine Farès Bou Najem (3 March 2021 – present)

Sources

 Annuario Pontificio, Libreria Editrice Vaticana, Città del Vaticano, 2003, .
 Baalbek, Dictionnaire d’Histoire et de Géographie ecclésiastiques, vol. VI, Paris 1932, coll. 7–8.

References

External links
 GigaCatholic, with incumbent bio links
 catholic-hierarchy.org

Maronite Church in Lebanon
Maronite Catholic eparchies